The Berkeley Journal of Employment & Labor Law (BJELL) is a law  journal that publishes articles focusing on current developments in labor and employment law. It was founded in 1975 as the Industrial Relations Law Journal. It changed its name to the current title in 1993. Articles in the journal cover legal issues dealing with employment discrimination, "traditional" labor law, public sector employment, international and comparative labor law, employee benefits, and the evolution of the doctrine of wrongful termination. In addition to scholarly articles, the journal includes student-authored comments, book reviews and essays. It is published twice a year by Berkeley Law.

BJELL is the most cited employment law journal in the world.

In order "to bring attention to the study and practice of American labor law and to spur the academic exchange of ideas about its contemporary significance," BJELL holds the annual David E. Feller Memorial Labor Law Lecture.

On October 25, 2018, BJELL won Berkeley Law's annual Halloween journal office decorating competition with its theme "The Red Scare."

References

External links
 Berkeley Law Web site

Labour law journals
Journal of Employment and Labor Law, Berkeley
Publications established in 1979
1979 establishments in California
Law in the San Francisco Bay Area
Law journals edited by students
American law journals